Mateusz Młyński (born 2 January 2001) is a Polish professional footballer who plays as a winger for Wisła Kraków.

References

External links

2001 births
Living people
Polish footballers
Association football midfielders
Poland youth international footballers
Poland under-21 international footballers
Arka Gdynia players
Wisła Kraków players
Ekstraklasa players
I liga players